Jean-Frédéric Morency (born May 30, 1989 in Paris, France) is a French basketball player who last played for French Pro A league club Boulazac Basket Dordogne. He formally played for BCM Gravelines.

References

1989 births
Living people
Basketball players from Paris
BCM Gravelines players
Boulazac Basket Dordogne players
Élan Béarnais players
French men's basketball players
Limoges CSP players
Nanterre 92 players
Small forwards